Willy Kutschbach (27 May 1907 – 24 June 1978) was a German racing cyclist. He finished in last place in the 1935 Tour de France.

References

External links
 

1907 births
1978 deaths
German male cyclists
People from Greiz
Cyclists from Thuringia